A runaway train is a type of railroad incident in which unattended rolling stock is accidentally allowed to roll onto the main line, a moving train loses enough braking power to be unable to stop in safety, or a train operates at unsafe speeds due to loss of operator control. If the uncontrolled rolling stock derails or hits another train, it will result in a train wreck.

A deadman's control, if the brakes are working, can prevent unattended rolling stock from moving.

A railway air brake can fail if valves on the pipe between each wagon are accidentally closed; the 1953 Pennsylvania Railroad train wreck and the 1988 Gare de Lyon train accident were results of a valve accidentally closed by the crew, reducing braking power.

A parked train or cut off cars may also run away if not properly tied down with a sufficient number of hand brakes.

Incidents
Accidents and incidents involving defective or improperly-set railway brakes include:

 Igandu train disaster, Tanzania (2002) – runaway backwards - 281 killed.
 Tenga rail disaster, Mozambique (2002) – runaway backwards - 192 killed.
 Martín Coronado, Argentina (1999) – Train's brakes failed during motoman's distraction, passing by six stations without him. Stopped by a passerby train keeper after noticing hysterical people inside the train.
 Colorado Springs, Colorado (1989) 67-car Burlington Northern coal train runaway 
 San Bernardino train disaster, California (1989) - brakes failed on freight train which crashed into houses
 Wasserburg am Inn, Upper Bavaria, Germany (1988) - on New Years Eve morning an EMU of Munich S-Bahn became a runaway train after the train driver went to the toilet in the terminal station Ebersberg. Train run the complete line till Wasserburg, where it ended at a buffer stopp. Nobody hurt, but equipment damage. 
 New Brunswick, Canada March (1987) Canadian National ore train derailed. The engineer was in the second engine while the conductor was in the caboose back at the rail yard. There are recordings from dispatch available on YouTube.
 Chester General rail crash, England (1972) - brakes failed on fuel train which collided with parked DMU.
 Jersey Central "ghost engine" incident, New Jersey (1959) - A single ALCO RS-3 locomotive of the Central Railroad of New Jersey left a terminal yard in Jersey City as a runaway and covered 22 miles in 36 minutes before it was stopped by a crewed locomotive on the tracks ahead. Incident suspected of being sabotage as throttle was open, air brakes set for running.
 Chapel-en-le-Frith, Great Britain (1957) – broken steam pipe made it impossible for crew to apply brakes.
 Federal Express train wreck, Union Station, Washington, DC, (1953) - valve closed by badly designed bufferplate.
 Wädenswil, Switzerland (1948) – Winter sport train was guided deliberately in a siding after the driver of the crocodile locomotive did not realise that he was in electric traction instead of dynamic brake while going downhill on a 5% grade. 21 killed.
 Torre del Bierzo rail disaster, Spain (1944) - brakes failed on an overloaded passenger train which collided with another in a tunnel; a third train was unaware and also crashed into it.
 Asheboro, North Carolina (1898) - an Aberdeen and Asheboro Railroad crew uncouples a locomotive from a freight train without setting the brakes on the cars properly; the cars soon roll downhill to collide with the locomotive, pinning the engine crew.
 Montparnasse derailment, Paris, France (1895) - Granville–Paris Express overran the buffer stop at its Gare Montparnasse terminus when its air brakes failed, crashed through the entire station, and fell onto the Place de Rennes killing one woman; five on the train and one in the street were injured.
 Armagh rail disaster, Ireland (1889) – runaway backwards led to change in law.
 Shipton-on-Cherwell train crash, Oxford, England (1874) - caused by fracture of a carriage wheel.

References

See also
 Dark territory
 Positive train control
 Railroad Safety Appliance Act
 :Category:Runaway train disasters

 *
Railway accidents and incidents